The 2016 Toronto FC II season was the second season in the club's history. In 2015 the team finished 11th in the Eastern Conference, therefore, missing the playoffs.

Roster

Players
As of the end of season.
The squad of Toronto FC II will be composed of an unrestricted number of first-team players on loan to the reserve team, players signed to TFC II, and TFC Academy players. Academy players who appear in matches with TFC II will retain their college eligibility.

Transfers

In

Loan In

Out

Competitions

Preseason

USL Pro

League table

Eastern Conference

Results summary

Results by round

Matches

Statistics

Squad and statistics

|}

Goals and assists 
Correct as of September 24, 2016

Clean sheets 
Includes all competitive matches.
Correct as of September 24, 2016

Disciplinary record 
Correct as of September 24, 2016

Recognition

USL Team of the Week

USL Goal of the Week

References

External links
 

Toronto FC II seasons
Toronto FC II
Toronto FC II
Toronto FC II